Nonai may refer to:
Nonai, Aomori, a former municipality in Aomori, Aomori, Japan
Nonai Station, a railway station in Aomori, Aomori, Japan
Nōnai Poison Berry, an ongoing Japanese slice of life romance josei manga series written and illustrated by Setona Mizushiro.